The FA Cup 1961–62 is the 81st season of the world's oldest football knockout competition; The Football Association Challenge Cup, or FA Cup for short. The large number of clubs entering the tournament from lower down the English football league system meant that the competition started with a number of preliminary and qualifying rounds. The 30 victorious teams from the Fourth Round Qualifying progressed to the First Round Proper.

Preliminary round

Ties

1st qualifying round

Ties

Replays

2nd replay

2nd qualifying round

Ties

Replays

2nd replay

3rd qualifying round

Ties

Replays

2nd replays

4th qualifying round
The teams that given byes to this round are Gateshead, Crook Town, Bishop Auckland, Wycombe Wanderers, Yeovil Town, Hereford United, South Shields, Worcester City, Oxford United, King's Lynn, Guildford City, Chelmsford City, Rhyl, Blyth Spartans, Margate, Bath City, Wisbech Town, Salisbury, Ashford Town (Kent), Kettering Town, Scarborough, Weymouth, Bridgwater Town and Hastings United

Ties

Replays

1961–62 FA Cup
See 1961-62 FA Cup for details of the rounds from the First Round Proper onwards.

External links
 Football Club History Database: FA Cup 1961–62
 FA Cup Past Results

Qual